Green House may refer to:

Buildings 
Hong Kong
7 Mallory Street, a tenement block formerly known as Green House

Malta
The Green House, Sliema

United States
Jacob Green House, Ashville, Alabama, listed on the National Register of Historic Places (NRHP) in St. Clair County, Alabama
Green House (Little Rock, Arkansas), listed on the NRHP in Little Rock, Arkansas
Harley E. Green House, Bear, Arkansas, listed on the NRHP in Garland County, Arkansas
Green-Rankin-Bembridge House, Long Beach, California
Green Mansion House (Kenton, Delaware)
Green Mansion (Newark, Delaware)
Joseph Green House, Orange Park, Florida
Mitchell J. Green Plantation, Claxton, Georgia, listed on the NRHP in Evans County, Georgia
Green-Poe House, Macon, Georgia, listed on the NRHP in Bibb County, Georgia
Green-Meldrim House, Savannah, Georgia
John A. Green Estate, Anamosa, Iowa
William Green House (Rochester, Iowa), listed on the NRHP in Cedar County, Iowa
M. B. Green Site, Petersburg, Kentucky, listed on the NRHP in Boone County, Kentucky
Green-Lovelace House, Sicily Island, Louisiana, listed on the NRHP in Catahoula Parish, Louisiana
Jonathan Green House, Stoneham, Massachusetts
Green House (Wakefield, Massachusetts)
Capt. William Green House, Wakefield, Massachusetts
Deacon Daniel Green House, Wakefield, Massachusetts
Alanson Green Farm House, Goodrich, Michigan, listed on the NRHP in Genesee County, Michigan
Garner Wynn Green House, Jackson, Mississippi, listed on the NRHP in Hinds County, Mississippi
Duff Green House, Vicksburg, Mississippi, listed on the NRHP in Warren County, Mississippi
Jesse R. Green Homestead, Trident, Montana, listed on the NRHP in Gallatin County, Montana
William Green House (Ewing Township, New Jersey), listed on the NRHP in Mercer County, New Jersey
Green-Reading House, Ewing Township, New Jersey, listed on the NRHP in Mercer County, New Jersey
Joseph Green Farmhouse, Duanesburg, New York
John Green House (Huntington Bay, New York)
Asahel Green Farm, Middlesex, New York
Nathan and Clarissa Green House, Oswego, New York
Herman Green House, Raleigh, North Carolina, listed on the NRHP in Wake County, North Carolina
Green-Hartsfield House, Rolesville, North Carolina
Lucius Green House, Perry, Ohio, listed on the NRHP in Lake County, Ohio
Bertha M. and Marie A. Green House, Portland, Oregon
Harry A. and Ada Green House, Portland, Oregon
Green-Evans House, Lynchburg, Tennessee, listed on the NRHP in Moore County, Tennessee
Sherwood Green House, Nolensville, Tennessee
Roland A. D. Green House, Abilene, Texas, listed on the NRHP in Taylor County, Texas
Rufus A. Green House, Bastrop, Texas, listed on the NRHP in Bastrop County, Texas
Henry G. and Annie B. Green House, Kendleton, Texas, listed on the NRHP in Fort Bend County, Texas
James Green House, Bountiful, Utah, listed on the NRHP in Davis County, Utah
Samuel Green House, Pleasant Grove, Utah
Alvin and Annie Green House, Sandy, Utah, listed on the NRHP in Salt Lake County, Utah
Albert and Letha Green House and Barn, Battle Ground, Washington
August G. and Theresa Green House, Stevens Point, Wisconsin

Other uses 
 The Green House, a novel by Mario Vargas Llosa
 Green House Project, an American national non-profit organization

See also
William Green House (disambiguation)
Greene House (disambiguation)
Greenhouse (disambiguation)